This is a list of Dutch television related events from 2005.

Events
13 February - 1994 Soundmixshow winner Glennis Grace is selected to represent Netherlands at the 2005 Eurovision Song Contest with her song "My Impossible Dream". She is selected to be the forty-sixth Dutch Eurovision entry during Nationaal Songfestival held at Pepsi Stage Theatre in Amsterdam.
15 October - Singer and runner up of the first series of Idols Jim Bakkum and his partner Julie Fryer win the first series of Dancing with the Stars.
22 December - Joost Hoebink wins the fifth series of Big Brother.

Debuts
20 August - Dancing with the Stars (2005-2009)

Television shows

1950s
NOS Journaal (1956–present)

1970s
Sesamstraat (1976–present)

1980s
Jeugdjournaal (1981–present)
Het Klokhuis (1988–present)

1990s
Goede tijden, slechte tijden (1990–present)
Big Brother (1999-2006)
De Club van Sinterklaas (1999-2009)

2000s
Idols (2002-2008, 2016–present)

Ending this year

Births

Deaths

See also
2005 in the Netherlands